CIIT Philippines - College of Arts and Technology (formerly Cosmopoint International Institute of Technology) is a private, non-sectarian college, and digital arts school in the Philippines that offers specialized and industry-based learning in the fields of web design, multimedia arts, computer graphics, 3D animation, mobile app development, game development, software engineering, and information technology.

It is located in Quezon City, Philippines. Sherwin O is the president and founder Niel Dagondon is the chairman of the board.

History 
CIIT Philippines - College of Arts and Technology was established in 2007 as Cosmopoint International Institute of Technology by Niel Dagondon. He is the founder and chief executive officer of Anino Games, a pioneer third-party game developer in the Philippines, and the director of Game Developers Association of the Philippines (GDAP).
Founded in 2007 in response to the outsourcing boom and the shortage of qualified Filipino IT and multimedia professionals, Anino Games partnered with technological organizations to establish an ideal school that will meet the practical demands of the Philippine workforce. CIIT stresses practical knowledge and applications as much as theories to students.

In 2008, CIIT introduced itself as a technical-vocational school offering two-year diploma courses and specialist programs to students in digital arts and IT. Its first diploma programs include  Computer Graphic Design, Multimedia Application, Software Engineering, Network Design, and E-business. Three years later, 3D Animation and Game Development were added to its list of course offerings.

CIIT is a previous member of the Cosmopoint Education Group from Kuala Lumpur, Malaysia and a partner of Kuala Lumpur Metropolitan University (KLMU). Through these tie-ups, students were given the option to proceed with their diploma courses, continue their studies in KLMU, and earn an International bachelor's degree in Malaysia.

Academic programs 
In 2013, however, the college has developed its own curriculum and acquired certification from the Commission on Higher Education to have its own bachelor's degree programs. These are Bachelor of Arts in Multimedia Arts with specializations in Digital Graphics Design, 3D Visualization, and Video and Motion Graphics; and Bachelor of Science in Computer Science with specializations in Software Engineering, Game Development, and Network Design.

Along with the two bachelor's degree programs, it also offers a diploma course based on the bachelor's degree courses.

Besides diploma and degree programs, the school also offers short courses in multimedia, web design, 3D animation, and game development. In addition, CIIT offers corporate training to companies needing customized instruction regarding the use of the latest software applications.

In January 2014, its BA Multimedia Arts Program was accredited by the Commission on Higher Education.

As part of the implementation of K-12 education system, CIIT Philippines also has a Senior High School program. Under the program, the students can specialize in multimedia arts, animation or programming. These specializations may then be transitioned into CIIT's corresponding college degree programs. In addition to being created to ensure a smooth transition, the SHS programs are also formed in such a way that the students will be able to pass the national certification exams for their chosen programs.

To cater to its growing population, CIIT moves to a new six-floor building (Interweave Campus) in Kamuning, Quezon City in January 2018. The Interweave Campus houses the college, senior high school, and specialist students and school employees.

Student life and culture

Student Achievements

On January 31, 2011, Zero Degree, a group of Multimedia Arts course students from CIIT, won as runner-up in thedo (Director), Francis Arandez (Asst. Director), Dennis Angelo Canizo and Jerivic Antoo (Story), Jerick Roncal and Mhike Balutan (Crew)Script Writer), Raymund Sabado (Propsmanro Degree's entry titled “The Last Drop” aimed to promote the importance of water conservation. The three-minute film depicted the predicaments of water shortage.

Meanwhile, two CIIT software engineering students were also awarded for passing IBM's DB2 Certification Examination. Earth Ponce D. Maniebo and Karl Lorenized were deemed IBM Certified Academic Associates on March 10, 2012.

In October 2012, Oliver Santiago was named as one of the winners in the Hyundai POP (Pride of the Philippines) Art Contest, an art competition organized by Hyundai Asia Resources, Inc. (HARI). His entry, “Drive with Pride”, a tribal art with the fusion of modern pop art concept, won a trophy, a cash prize of 50,000, and special Hyundai merchandise. Among the 800 contenders, he and 14 others were chosen to feature their artworks in the Hyundai 2013 Calendar and limited edition Hyundai merchandises.

In the same year, Santiago's submitted artwork titled “Freedom” also graced the 2012 booklet cover of Graphika Manila, an annual multimedia and graphic design event in the Philippines. His second entry, “World of Doodle” also made it to the book, together with other digital illustrations and photos from contributing artists locally and abroad. Copies of the 2012 booklet were distributed to over 2,000 design professionals and students who came in attendance to the said event. This story was also published in the Lifestyle section of the Philippine Daily Inquirer on October 5, 2012.

It was also in 2012 when alumna Ana Patricia Victorino Mendoza, widely known as Ana Victorino, was featured in "Manila Standard Today" as a makeup guru. With her makeup artistry, Ana is able to glamorize a seemingly common face. Her very first makeup tutorial video on YouTube, "Everyday Makeup Tutorial," was uploaded on January 3, 2012, and it reached about 100,000 hits just after six months.

In 2015, Chito Velez and Angelo Bacani won the Best Video in San Miguel Yamamura Packing Corporation's All You Can Campaign: Video Making Contest. In 2016, Joseph Renier Peñaflor, Reiner Laurence Peñaflor, Elvin Jeffrey Abquina, and Angelo Bacani won 3rd Place in Inforgraphic Design in the DSWD's #StopChildPornPh: Child Online Protection (COP) Hackaton 2016. In that same year, a team of Game Development students also created ArchaeocetiVR, a Virtual Reality game for mobile devices. The game went on to the finals of that year's GameOn 2016.

In February 2017, Padayon films, a group of CIIT art students, won 3rd place in the 4th leg of Security Bank's Reel Quest Video contest. In October 2017, a group of CIIT Senior High Students had their works exhibited in the 16th International Art Exhibition for Children and Young People. A month later, VeggieStew Games, a team composed of CIIT game development students, had their game Farmer Fran: Running Out of Sunlight, nominated in GameOn 2017's Game of the Year award.

Industry-Based Education 

The college adopted an industry-based curriculum to expose and prepare students for real-life career activities. Its curriculum, which was co-designed by CIIT, Anino Games, and other industry partners, provides a specialized teaching method that conforms to the technical needs of contemporary companies for digital arts and information technology in the Philippines.

Events and Traditions 

Acquaintance Celebration - which held every first trimester of the academic year.
PH.antasya - annual art contest developed by CIIT, which aims to encourage and recognize students with individual passions for arts and design. The art competition is open to all graduating Filipino high school students and is composed of three categories (traditional arts, digital arts, game development) with two or three winners per category.
Video Music Awards - encouraging students to showcase their talents through video production.
First stop - An orientation/acquaintance party for all our new college students.
Sportsfest - Annual week-long sporting events.

Population 

From 21 students in 2008, the school's student population increased by 500% on its second year of operation. In 2014, there are more than 500 students for all its courses. There are currently 577 students as of February 2017.

Student organizations 
The following organizations are recognized by the CIIT Student Organizations Council and CIIT Office for Student Affairs for the Academic Year 2014–2015.

24 Frames- Video and Filmmaker's Organization
Atelier- Traditional and Digital Art Organization
CIIT Atleta - Sports Organization
CIIT Media - College Press and Publication
CIIT Tunes - Music Organization
CIIT Student Council - Student-governing body
CGC- Gaming Community
Coscade- Cosplay Organization
LBX- 2D Animation Organization
Obscura- Photography Organization
Pixel Hive- Community of Digital Illustrators and Concept Designers
Safezone- LGBT+ Organization
Syntax- Programming Organization
SPADES- CIIT Dance Crew
Telon- Theater Organization

Partners 

Game Developers Association of the Philippines – CIIT has been an academic member of GDAP since 2008, along with De La Salle University-Manila, Mapua Institute of Technology, and San Sebastian College- Recoletos de Manila
Anino Games is a leading game developer in the Philippines and a partner of CIIT since 2008.
Wacom
Autodesk
Adobe
IBM Philippines – CIIT signed a partnership with IBM Philippines on October 19, 2011.

References 

Private universities and colleges in the Philippines
Universities and colleges in Metro Manila
Universities and colleges in Quezon City